Wheatland is the common name of a house built in 1838 in the Knob Creek Historic District, near present-day Johnson City.

Both brothers married daughters of Valentine DeVault.

William and Peter were both trained as carpenters, and traveled through North Carolina taking commissions for important buildings, such as the Guilford Courthouse.  The exceptional carvings and woodwork at Wheatland were undertaken by William.

The house is Federal (or Adam) in style, and is most notable for its exceptional interior woodwork and the double Chinese Chippendale porch running the length of the kitchen wing.

Wheatland
Federal architecture in Tennessee
Houses completed in 1838